Tahaneh-ye Sofla (also Romanized as Ţahaneh-ye Soflá and Ţahneh-ye Soflá) is a village in Sar Firuzabad Rural District, Firuzabad District, Kermanshah County, Kermanshah Province, Iran. At the 2006 census, its population was 82, in 18 families.

References 

Populated places in Kermanshah County